Nedging-with-Naughton is a civil parish in Suffolk, England. Located on the B1078 between Bildeston and Needham Market, it consists of three settlements;
Naughton
Nedging
Nedging Tye

The parish contains two areas classified as Ancient Woodland; Glebe Town Grove and Tyrell's Grove. Both sites are also nature reserves. In 2001 the population of the parish was 388, increasing to 404 at the 2011 Census. The parish was formed on 1 April 1935 from the parishes of Nedging and Naughton and part of Bildeston.

References

External links
Parish council website

Civil parishes in Suffolk
Babergh District